Kjartan Kristiansen (born 14 August 1963 in Trondheim, Norway) is the guitarist and backing vocalist in the Norwegian band DumDum Boys, and he is also the lyricist and main songwriter.

Biography 

Kristiansen established the Punk band Wannskrækk in 1978, and in 1985 they changed the name to DumDum Boys. They were one of the leading Norwegian rock bands in the 1980s and 90s.

He has also been part of "The Beste", which included former members of The Aller Værste!. The album from 1985 contains two songs by Kristiansen, that he performs on the record. in additione he has released an EP and two albums with the band 'Tweeterfriendly Music' in the period from 2001 to 2003.

In 2006 he was awarded Edvardprisen in the class of Popular music for the song «Enhjørning» on the DumDum Boys album Gravitasjon. Together with Aslak Dørum he was awarded Spellemannprisen 2009 in the class Copywriter for the lyrics to the album Tidsmaskin by Dum Dum Boys. Kristiansen received the Lyricist Fund Award in 2012. He has also produced and mixed the latest album If Only as a Ghost (2013) by Jonas Alaska.

Honors 
2006: Edvardprisen in the class Popular music for the song «Enhjørning» on the DumDum Boys album Gravitasjon
2009: Spellemannprisen in the class Copywriter for the lyrics to the album Tidsmaskin by Dum Dum Boys
2012: Lyricist Fund Award for his contribution to Norwegian rock music lyrics during 35 years

Discography (in selection) 

Wannskrækk
1981: Faen küler treffer aldri riktig (Oh Yeah!)
1982: ...Wannskrækk ..12''' (Plasma Plater)
1986: X-Mas Funeral Party (Knallsyndikatet)

DumDum Boys
1988: Blodig Alvor (NaNaNaNa) (Columbia)
1989: Splitter pine (CBS)
1990: Pstereo (CBS)
1992: Riff - Wannskrækk 1980–85 (Oh Yeah!), compilation
1992: Transit (Oh Yeah!)
1994: Ludium (Oh Yeah!)
1994: 1001 Watt (Oh Yeah!), live
1996: Sus (Oh Yeah!)
1998: Totem (Oh Yeah!)
2001: Schlägers (Oh Yeah!), compilation
2006: Gravitasjon (Oh Yeah!)
2009: Tidsmaskin (Oh Yeah!)
2012: Ti liv (Oh Yeah!)

Tweeterfriendly Music
2000: Vol. 1 Maxi Single (Warner Music Norway)
2001: Enjoy Tweeterfriendly Music Vol. 2 (Warner Music Norway)
2003: Gin & Phonic ***3-03 '' (Warner Music Norway)

References

Living people
Musicians from Trondheim
1963 births
Norwegian guitarists
Norwegian male guitarists
Norwegian songwriters
Punk rock guitarists
DumDum Boys members